Christina Pazsitzky (born June 18, 1976), known by her stage name Christina P, is a Canadian-born American stand-up comedian, podcaster, writer, host and TV personality. Pazsitzky co-hosts the Your Mom's House podcast along with her husband, fellow comedian Tom Segura, and also hosts the Where My Moms At? podcast.

Early life
Pazsitzky was born in Windsor, Ontario, Canada, to Hungarian parents who had escaped from Hungary in 1969. Her family relocated to the United States in her early childhood, settling in Southern California, where she was raised. Before turning to comedy, Pazsitzky studied philosophy at the University of San Francisco (graduating in 1999) and the University of Oxford, then briefly attended a law school for two weeks.

Career
Pazsitzky's TV debut was in 1998 as a cast member of MTV's Road Rules: Down Under.

Pazsitzky was a member of the Deathsquad Network of stand-up comedians.

Pazsitzky has performed in the Middle East, Africa, and South Korea with USO tours.

In 2012, Your Mom's House was one of the six nominees in the Best Comedy category at the first annual Stitcher Awards for podcasts.

In 2018, Pazsitzky and Segura landed a TV deal with CBS, who gave a pilot production commitment for their show The Little Things.

Where My Moms At? podcast

Pazsitzky hosts Where My Moms At?, a comedy podcast based around real issues in the world of motherhood. Episodes often feature guests from the world of entertainment and pop culture, such as Hila Klein, Alyssa Milano, Alison Rosen, and LeeAnn Kreischer, wife of comedian Bert Kreischer.

Personal life
In early 2020, Pazsitzky and Segura bought a $6.7 million mansion in Pacific Palisades, Los Angeles.

Pazsitzky and Segura moved to Austin, Texas in 2021.

Stand-up comedy specials

Albums

TV appearances

Filmography

Television

References

External links
 
 Your Mom's House Podcast
 

1976 births
Canadian emigrants to the United States
American people of Hungarian descent
American stand-up comedians
American women comedians
American women podcasters
American podcasters
Canadian people of Hungarian descent
Canadian stand-up comedians
Canadian women comedians
Canadian women podcasters
Canadian podcasters
Living people
Road Rules cast members
The Challenge (TV series) contestants
Writers from Los Angeles
Writers from Windsor, Ontario
Comedians from California
Comedians from Ontario
21st-century American comedians
21st-century American women